Mitromorpha sutherlandica is an extinct species of sea snail, a marine gastropod mollusk in the family Mitromorphidae.

Description

Distribution
This extinct species is endemic to New Zealand.

References

 Powell, A.W.B. 1979: New Zealand Mollusca: Marine, Land and Freshwater Shells, Collins, Auckland 
 Maxwell, P.A. (2009). Cenozoic Mollusca. pp. 232–254 in Gordon, D.P. (ed.) New Zealand inventory of biodiversity. Volume one. Kingdom Animalia: Radiata, Lophotrochozoa, Deuterostomia. Canterbury University Press, Christchurch.

External links
 

sutherlandica
Gastropods described in 1942